Unravelling, or variants, may refer to:

Unravelling (logic), a concept in sheaf theory
Unravelling, a novel by Elizabeth Graver

Music

Albums
Unravelling (album), by We Were Promised Jetpacks, 2014
The Unraveling (Drive-By Truckers album), 2020
The Unraveling (Rise Against album) or the title song, 2001
The Unraveling (EP), or the title song, "Unraveling", by Dir En Grey, 2013

Songs
"Unraveling" (song), by Sevendust, 2010
"Unravelling", a song by Charlotte Church from Back to Scratch
"Unraveling", a song by Evanescence from Synthesis
"Unravelling", a song by Melanie C from Version of Me
"Unravelling", a song by Wendy Matthews from Beautiful View

See also
 Unravel (disambiguation)
 Unraveled (disambiguation)
 Unraveller (disambiguation)